Leo Schipper (20 September 1938 – 26 September 1984) was a Surinamese football manager and player who played for NAKS, SV Transvaal, SV Robinhood and the Suriname national team. After his playing career he took on a coaching role with SV Robinhood, becoming manager of the club before passing the torch to Ronald Kolf.

Career

Early career
Born on 20 September 1938 in Paramaribo, Surinam, Schipper began playing football on the Mr. Bronsplein from where he was picked up by NAKS. Following a successful season, he transferred to SV Transvaal in 1957.

SV Transvaal
On 11 April 1957, Schipper transferred to SV Transvaal. His period with Transvaal was brief, transferring to SV Robinhood after only one season.

SV Robinhood
On 28 April 1958, Schipper or ‘Baas Skippa’ as he was commonly known joined SV Robinhood. He would remain with Robinhood for a decade in which the club traveled and played International matches against teams from Trinidad and Tobago, Brazil and the Netherlands Antilles. He also helped Robinhood to win two national championships in 1959 and 1961.

Schipper's biggest match was during his farewell match in the final round of the 1963 season on Valentine's Day (14 February 1964). Robinhood lost the match 1–0 to second place SV Leo Victor, with Leo Victor finishing as the league champions that season. The following season Robinhood would go on to win the national championship going undefeated, at which point Schipper had already retired as a player. The ceremonial final match of Schipper was overseen by Leo Raggobar and Eugene Rudge.

International career
Schipper played for the Suriname national team. Having made 26 appearances for the first team, he was a part of the team which travelled to Peru for the 1960 Summer Olympics qualifiers, where he played against Cuba and Peru. He made his debut on 20 September 1959 in a friendly match against Martinique which ended in a 1–0 win. On 25 October 1959, Schipper played one of his best games against Trinidad and Tobago at the Rif Stadion in Willemstad, Curaçao. Two days later Suriname managed a 2–2 draw against the Netherlands Antilles, which was the first time the national team did not lose while playing in Curaçao. He scored his first goal on 4 April 1963 against Trinidad and Tobago, in a 4–3 win at the National Stadion.

Managerial career
After his playing career Schipper took a coaching position with SV Robinhood, managing the club for two seasons before Ro Kolf took over. He later launched the Rensprojekt together with Jimmy Bhagwandas and Uncle Hoen, a sports association in his neighborhood in Paramaribo where he was an active member until his untimely death. There is a street in Paramaribo called the 'Leo Schipperstraat' which is named after him.

Career statistics

International goals

Scores and results list Suriname' goal tally first.

Honours

Player
S.V. Robinhood
 Hoofdklasse (2): 1959, 1961

References 

1938 births
1984 deaths
Sportspeople from Paramaribo
Surinamese footballers
Suriname international footballers
Surinamese football managers
S.V. Robinhood managers
S.V. Robinhood players
S.V. Transvaal players
SVB Eerste Divisie players
SVB Eerste Divisie managers
20th-century Surinamese businesspeople
Association football midfielders